Barbara M. G. Lynn (born September 19, 1952) is a United States district judge of the United States District Court for the Northern District of Texas, with chambers in Dallas, Texas.

Early life and education 
Born in Binghamton, New York, Lynn received a Bachelor of Arts degree from University of Virginia in 1973. She received a Juris Doctor from Southern Methodist University Dedman School of Law in 1976.

Professional career 
Lynn was in private practice from 1976 to 1999 at the law firm Carrington Coleman in Dallas. Lynn was the firm's first female associate (1976–1982) and then became the firm's first female partner (1983–1999) prior to joining the bench.

Federal judicial service 
On March 25, 1999, Lynn was nominated by President Bill Clinton to a seat on the United States District Court for the Northern District of Texas vacated by Harry Barefoot Sanders, Jr. She was confirmed by the United States Senate on November 17, 1999 and received her commission on November 22, 1999. On May 1, 2016, she became the chief judge of the Northern District of Texas, the first woman to hold the position. Her term as chief judge ended on September 6, 2022.

Notable cases

Dallas Mayor corruption
Lynn was the presiding judge in the case of former Dallas Mayor Pro-Tempore Don Hill. Hill, and his wife Sheila Farrington Hill were sentenced on February 26, 2010 after being convicted on bribery and money laundering charges. Don Hill was sentenced to eighteen years in prison while his wife was sentenced to nine years in prison. The judge called the actions "a betrayal to our city".

Lyrick Studios vs. Big Idea Productions
In 2001, film studio Lyrick Studios filed a lawsuit against Big Idea Productions, creator of the Christian show VeggieTales, for "breach of contract." The judge assigned to the case was Lynn, who denied Big Idea's request for summary judgement, thereby allowing the case to go to trial in April 2003. Lyrick argued that they had a binding though unsigned agreement with Big Idea to distribute VeggieTales for the company, and that Big Idea had breached the deal by moving to Warner Music at the end of 2001.

A jury ruled against Big Idea Productions and Lynn awarded Lyrick $11M as well as legal fees, causing Big Idea to file for bankruptcy. Big Idea appealed Lynn's ruling and the United States Court of Appeals for the Fifth Circuit overturned the judgement in August 2005, ruling that faxes and memos set out by Lyrick were not sufficient under the law; therefore, Lynn should have granted Big Idea's request for summary judgement.

Duncan v. Bonta
Sitting with the 9th Circuit, Lynn dissented when the 9th circuit blocked California's law limiting gun magazine capacity to 10 bullets. The ruling was made on August 14, 2020. On November 30, 2021, the 9th circuit in a 7-4 decision, sitting en banc, reversed the prior decision and upheld the law, thus affirming Lynn's dissent.

See also 
 List of Jewish American jurists

References

External links

1952 births
Living people
20th-century American judges
20th-century American women judges
21st-century American judges
21st-century American women judges
Dedman School of Law alumni
Judges of the United States District Court for the Northern District of Texas
Lawyers from Binghamton, New York
United States district court judges appointed by Bill Clinton
University of Virginia alumni